Marie Annabelle Jennifer Lascar (born 25 April 1985 in Quatre Bornes) is a Mauritian middle-distance runner. She represented her country at the 2008 and 2012 Summer Olympics failing to reach the semifinals.

Her personal best in the event is 2:05.45, set during her second Olympic start.

Competition record

References

External links
 

1985 births
Living people
Mauritian female middle-distance runners
Olympic athletes of Mauritius
Athletes (track and field) at the 2008 Summer Olympics
Athletes (track and field) at the 2012 Summer Olympics
Commonwealth Games competitors for Mauritius
Athletes (track and field) at the 2014 Commonwealth Games
Athletes (track and field) at the 2011 All-Africa Games
African Games competitors for Mauritius